Cathrine Nøttingnes (born 5 September 1974) is a Norwegian paralympic athlete. She participated in the 2000 Paralympic Summer Games in Sydney, where she won a total of three medals in cycling. She also participated in the 1994 Paralympic Winter Games in Lillehammer, and 1998 Paralympic Winter Games, in Nagano, in cross-country skiing.

She is visually impaired, competes in class B2 and cycled with Marianne Bruun.

Career 
She competed at the 2000 Paralympic Summer Games, winning a silver medal in cycling, tandem, 3,000 meter pursuit, Bronze medal in cycling, tandem, 1 kilometer time trial, and bronze medal in cycling, tandem, road race.

At the 1998 Paralympic Winter Games, in Nagano, she placed ninth in 5 km Classical Technique B2-3.

References 

1974 births
Living people
Sportspeople from Bergen
Paralympic cyclists of Norway
Paralympic cross-country skiers of Norway
Norwegian female cyclists
Norwegian female cross-country skiers
Cross-country skiers at the 1994 Winter Paralympics
Cross-country skiers at the 1998 Winter Paralympics
Cyclists at the 2000 Summer Paralympics
Medalists at the 2000 Summer Paralympics
Paralympic silver medalists for Norway
Paralympic bronze medalists for Norway